Canada competed at the 1968 Summer Olympics in Mexico City, Mexico, held from 12 to 27 October 1968 . 139 competitors, 111 men and 28 women, took part in 124 events in 14 sports. It is the inaugural Summer Olympics where the Canadian team marched under the new Maple Leaf flag. The youngest competitor for Canada was gymnast Theresa McDonnell who was 14 years old. The oldest competitor was equestrian Zoltan Sztehlo who was 46 years old.

Medalists

Gold
 Jim Day, Thomas Gayford, James Elder – Equestrian, team jumping grand prix

Silver
 Elaine Tanner – Swimming, women's 100 m backstroke
 Elaine Tanner – Swimming, women's 200 m backstroke
 Ralph Hutton – Swimming, men's 400 m freestyle

Bronze
 Angela Coughlan, Marilyn Corson-Whitney, Elaine Tanner, and Marion Lay – Swimming, women's 4×100 m freestyle relay

Athletics

Women's javelin throw 
Jay Dahlgren placed 13th

Women's pentathlon 
Jenny Meldrum placed 11th

Women's 800 metres 
Abigail Hoffman placed 7th

Men's 100 metres 
Harry Jerome placed 7th

Men's 5000 metres 
Bob Finlay placed 11th

Men's marathon 
Andy Boychuk placed 10th

Boxing

Canoeing

Cycling

Six cyclists represented Canada in 1968.

Individual road race
 Marcel Roy
 Joe Jones
 Jules Béland
 Yves Landry

Team time trial
 Joe Jones
 Jules Béland
 Marcel Roy
 Yves Landry

Sprint
 Jocelyn Lovell
 Bob Boucher

1000m time trial
 Jocelyn Lovell

Diving

Equestrian

Jumping Individual- James Elder placed 6th out of 7 in the final

Jumping Team- James Elder, James Day and Thomas Gayford.

Fencing

Five fencers, four men and one woman, represented Canada in 1968.

Men's foil
 Gerry Wiedel
 Magdy Conyd
 Peter Bakonyi

Men's team foil
 Magdy Conyd, Peter Bakonyi, Gerry Wiedel, John Andru

Men's épée
 Peter Bakonyi
 Magdy Conyd
 Gerry Wiedel

Men's team épée
 Peter Bakonyi, John Andru, Magdy Conyd, Gerry Wiedel

Men's sabre
 John Andru

Women's foil
 Sigrid Chatel

Gymnastics

Rowing

There were seven rowing events for men only and Canada entered four boats. In the coxed eight, John Richardson in seat 5 was replaced with Daryl Sturdy in the B final.

Sailing

Shooting

Ten shooters, all male, represented Canada in 1968.

25 m pistol
 Jules Sobrian
 Keith Elder

50 m pistol
 William Hare
 Jules Sobrian

50 m rifle, three positions
 Gerry Ouellette
 Alf Mayer

50 m rifle, prone
 Gerry Ouellette
 Rudy Schulze

Trap
 John Primrose
 Edward Shaske

Skeet
 Donald Sanderlin
 Harry Willsie

Swimming

Weightlifting

Light Heavyweight 
Pierre St. Jean placed 10th out of 11 in the final

Wrestling

References

Nations at the 1968 Summer Olympics
1968
Summer Olympics